Married for Life is a British seven-episode sitcom with one series. It was produced by Central Television and Columbia TriStar Central Productions and is a remake of the American sitcom Married... with Children.

Cast
The Bundys were renamed as the Butlers: Russ Abbot played Ted/Al, Susan Kyd was Pam/Peggy, Lucy Blakely played Nikki/Kelly, and Peter England was Lee/Bud. The Rhoadeses were renamed Hollingsworth: the Steve character was recast with Hugh Bonneville and Marcy was renamed Judy and played by Julie Dawn Cole. The series featured an early performance from Rob Brydon.

Episode list

References

External links
 

1990s British sitcoms
ITV sitcoms
1996 British television series debuts
1996 British television series endings
Television series by ITV Studios
Television series by Sony Pictures Television
English-language television shows
British television series based on American television series
Married... with Children remakes
Television shows produced by Central Independent Television